This article summarizes the events, album releases, and album release dates in hip hop music for the year 2020.

Events

January
On January 1, Saint Paul, Minnesota rapper Lexii Alijai died of an accidental drug overdose.
On January 2, DaBaby was detained by Miami police for robbery investigations.
On January 6, G Herbo pled guilty to battery. On the same day, Florida rapper 9lokkNine was arrested for carrying a concealed firearm and potentially faces up to five years in prison.
On January 9, New Orleans bounce rapper 5thward Weebie died of a heart attack.
On January 17, Eminem released his eleventh studio album, Music to Be Murdered By, with no prior announcement and he became the first artist ever to have 10 consecutive albums debuting at number one on the Billboard 200. On the same day, New York rapper Pop Smoke was released from jail on a bond of $250,000 after having been arrested with a stolen Rolls-Royce vehicle worth $375,000. He was prohibited to leave the United States without the government's permission.
On January 26, Tyler, the Creator won a Grammy for Best Rap Album with Igor, and 21 Savage won a Grammy for Best Rap Song with "A Lot" featuring J. Cole. Nipsey Hussle posthumously won two Grammys for Best Rap/Sung Performance with "Higher" with DJ Khaled and John Legend, and Best Rap Performance for "Racks in the Middle" with Roddy Ricch and Hit-Boy.

February
On February 19, Pop Smoke was murdered in an apparent home invasion robbery in Hollywood Hills California.
On February 21, it was announced that Paul Rosenberg would be stepping down as CEO of Def Jam.

March
 On March 2, after 35 years with the group, Flavor Flav was fired from Public Enemy. It would later become a hoax.
 On March 8, a person was shot at a Lil Baby concert in Birmingham.
 On March 30, Kodak Black was sentenced to 12 months in prison.

April
 On April 2, 6ix9ine was released from prison because of his health condition due to Coronavirus concerns. He was on house arrest for the remainder of his sentence which ended in August the same year. On the same day, YNW Melly told fans he was diagnosed with COVID-19 in a Florida jail.
 On April 3, Playboi Carti was arrested on gun and drug charges in Georgia. Police found guns, 12 bags of marijuana, Xanax, codeine and oxycodone.
 On April 6, Mac P Dawg, a frequent collaborator of Shoreline Mafia, was shot and killed.
 On April 8, rapper and model Chynna died of an apparent drug overdose.
 On April 16, French Montana and Jim Jones squashed their beef after 15 years.
 On April 21, Lil Wayne launched Young Money Radio on Apple Music.
 On April 23, Fred the Godson died of COVID-19 complications.
 On April 28, Orlando, Florida rapper LPB Poody and three other people were shot during a visual.

May
 On May 7, rapper Richie Jerk was shot and killed in Chicago while driving with a friend.

June
 On June 19, Chicago rapper Tray Savage was shot and killed. On the same day, Hurricane Chris was arrested for murder in Louisiana.
 On June 25, rapper Huey was shot and killed in St Louis, Missouri.
 On June 30, rapper Stepa J. Groggs from Injury Reserve died.

July
 On July 4, Kanye West announced his 2020 presidential campaign.
 On July 12, rapper Marlo was shot and killed.
 On July 13, Tory Lanez was arrested for gun possession. He is also accused of shooting Megan Thee Stallion in the foot.
 On July 16, Logic announced his new album No Pressure was releasing July 24, and he would retire later on.
 On July 29, American rapper and singer Malik B. died. He was a founding member of hip hop group The Roots. On the same day, British rapper Wiley was permanently suspended from Twitter over antisemitism comments. He was banned from Facebook and Instagram just days prior.

August
 On August 1, prior to the 25th anniversary of Only Built 4 Cuban Linx..., Raekwon announced the third installment.
 On August 4, Chicago rapper FBG Duck was shot and killed at a shopping area in Chicago's Gold Coast.
 On August 5, Juelz Santana was released from prison.
 On August 6, rapper YBN Nahmir announced via Twitter that the YBN collective has officially disbanded. Rapper and member YBN Cordae subsequently dropped the "YBN" portion of his stage name.
 On August 9, Rick Ross squashed his beef with 50 Cent.
 On August 11, the XXL 2020 Freshman Class was revealed, in which rappers Polo G, Lil Tjay, Jack Harlow, Baby Keem, Lil Keed, Calboy, Fivio Foreign, Latto, NLE Choppa, 24kGoldn, Rod Wave, and Chika.  
 On August 29, Silentó was arrested for domestic violence in Santa Ana, California.

September
 On September 8, Juicy J and DJ Paul sued Suicideboys for $6.4 million.
 On September 15, Cardi B filed for divorced from Offset.
 On September 30, Nicki Minaj gave birth to a son with her husband Kenneth Petty.

October
 On October 1, 6ix9ine was hospitalized due to overdosing on caffeine and weight loss pills.
 On October 7, Chip released two diss records directly aimed towards fellow UK rapper, Stormzy.
 On October 8, Tory Lanez was arrested for the felony assault with a weapon in the shooting incident of Megan Thee Stallion.
 On October 12, Blac Youngsta was arrested for possession of a firearm. On the same day, Fivio Foreign was arrested for assault.
 On October 13, Saint Dog was pronounced dead after being found unresponsive.
 On October 14, Lil Xan was sued for pulling a gun on a man during a 2Pac argument.
 On October 23, Young Buck was arrested for domestic assault.
 On October 31, MF Doom died. His death wasn't publicly announced until December 31.

November
On November 4, Drakeo the Ruler was released from prison.
 On November 4, Glenn Johnson, brother of DaBaby, committed suicide at the age of 34 in Charlotte, North Carolina.
 On November 6, King Von was shot and killed in Atlanta, Georgia.
 On November 11, MO3 was shot and killed in Dallas, Texas.
 On November 12, it was announced that Jeezy would be senior advisor of Def Jam and signed a new deal.
 On November 15, Benny the Butcher was shot in Houston outside of a Walmart.
 On November 17, Lil Wayne was arrested and charged with possession of a firearm.
 On November 19, Gucci Mane and Jeezy squashed their beef after 15 years during a Verzuz battle.
 On November 23, the brother of 21 Savage was stabbed to death in London, England, the same day that the brother of YoungBoy Never Broke Again was shot in Baton Rouge, Louisiana.
 On November 28, Lil Yase was shot and killed in Alameda County, California.

December
 On December 1, Casanova was charged by the FBI for racketeering murder, narcotics, firearms, and fraud offenses. Later on, he turned himself into the authorities.
 On December 2, G Herbo was allegedly charged in fraud scheme for using fake identification.
 On December 4, Young M.A was arrested for reckless driving.
 On December 8, A Boogie wit da Hoodie was arrested for drug and gun possession.
 On December 9, Zoey Dollaz was shot multiple times in Miami, Florida.
 On December 11, Lil Wayne pled guilty to a firearm charge.
 On December 15, Rowdy Rebel was released from prison.
 On December 23, Ecstasy of the group Whodini died.
 On December 31, MF Doom's death was made public. He died on October 31.

Released albums

January

February

March

April

May

June

July

August

September

October

November

December

Highest-charting songs

Highest first-week consumption

All critically reviewed albums ranked

Metacritic

AnyDecentMusic?

See also
 Previous article: 2019 in hip hop music
 Next article: 2021 in hip hop music

References

Hip hop
Hip hop music by year